Petrophile juncifolia is a species of flowering plant in the family Proteaceae and is endemic to southwestern Western Australia. It is a small, domed shrub with needle-shaped leaves, and heads of yellow to cream-coloured flowers.

Description

Taxonomy
Petrophile juncifolia was first formally described in 1840 by John Lindley in A Sketch of the Vegetation of the Swan River Colony. The specific epithet (juncifolia) means "rush-leaved".

Distribution and habitat
This petrophile mostly grows in winter-wet places between Perth and Waroona in the Jarrah Forest and Swan Coastal Plain biogeographic regions in the southwest of Western Australia.

Conservation status
Petrophile juncifolia is classified as "not threatened" by the Government of Western Australia Department of Parks and Wildlife.

References

juncifolia
Eudicots of Western Australia
Endemic flora of Western Australia
Plants described in 1840
Taxa named by John Lindley